Cyphorhinus is a genus of birds in the family Troglodytidae. Established by Jean Cabanis in 1844, it contains the following species:
 Song wren (Cyphorhinus phaeocephalus)
 Chestnut-breasted wren (Cyphorhinus thoracicus)
 Musician wren (Cyphorhinus arada)

The name Cyphorhinus is a combination of the Greek words kuphos, meaning "hump" or "hunch" and rhis or rhinos, meaning "nose" (or, in this case, bill). It has been emended from the earlier incarnation Cyphorhina.

References

 
Troglodytidae
Higher-level bird taxa restricted to the Neotropics
Taxonomy articles created by Polbot